This list includes General Commanders of the Turkish Gendarmerie, who were, in their time of service, nominal heads of the Turkish Gendarmerie.

The current General Commander of the Turkish Gendarmerie is General , since 21 August 2017.

See also 
List of Chiefs of the Turkish General Staff
List of Commanders of the Turkish Land Forces
List of Commanders of the Turkish Naval Forces
List of Commanders of the Turkish Air Force
List of Commandants of the Turkish Coast Guard

References

Sources 
Hizmeti Geçen Komutanlarımız in the official website of the Turkish Gendarmerie.

Gendarmerie